Mlawu ka Rarabe was a son of Rarabe ka Phalo, the founder of the right hand house of the Xhosa nation.

Mlawu is known to have had three sons of which the Great son Ngqika ka Mlawu disposed of his uncle Ndlambe ka Rarabe as paramount chief of the Rarabe. The other two sons where Ntimbo ka Rarabe a (Right Hand son) and Hobe ka Rarabe.

Mlawu died in 1782

Xhosa people
1782 deaths
Year of birth unknown
Heirs apparent who never acceded